Craig Farrell may refer to:
Craig Farrell (footballer) (1982–2022), English footballer
Craig Farrell (rugby league) (born 1981), English rugby league player
Craig Farrell (politician) (born 1964), Australian politician